= Mister Teen Indonesia =

MISTER TEEN INDONESIA
- Formation: 2015
- Type: Teen Male Pageant
- Headquarters: Surabaya
- Location: INA
- Official language: Bahasa Indonesia
- President: Raka Wicaksana
- Key people: Edin Muhammad
- Website: www.misterteenindonesia.com

Mister Teen Indonesia is a teen role model search that specifically helped promote ASEAN Community 2015 from the level of adolescents and children. While in general, Mister Teen Indonesia should be able to be active teens who can invite other teens to become Indonesia's young generation who behave positively that continues to develop his talent. For this reason, talent and good communication skills are two (2) most important main aspects of this selection. Mister Teen Indonesia winner will represent Indonesia to the world level event selection titled "Mister Teen International".

Tandi Islami, 2nd Runner Up of the Mister Teen Indonesia 2015 took over the title of Mister Teen Indonesia 2015 after the real winner, Dolly Parlin won the title of Mister Teen International 2015 while the 1st Runner Up, Ryandi Anugerah is returned to his regional director for certain important purpose. Based on The IMP Organization Protocoler, Ryandi could not get the title in the same time he go to Mister Global Teen under the license of his respective agency.

In the second edition of Mister Teen Indonesia (2016) the province of Banten won Mister Teen Indonesia 2016, William Gunawan and as a winner of Mister Teen Indonesia he competed internationally in Mister Teen International 2016. He won Back to Back Mister Teen International's crown from Dolly Parlin former Mister Teen International 2015 which is also from Indonesia. Muhammad Rizqinov, 1st Runner Up Mister Teen Indonesia 2016 took over the title Mister Teen Indonesia 2016 and also will compete in 2017 edition of Mister Teen International.

== History ==
Mister Teen Indonesia pageant was founded in 2015 by Edin Muhammad, Founder of Indonesia Male Pageants Organization (IMP Organization). Mister Teen Indonesia event was conceptualized like Mr. Universal Ambassador, International level contest that also belongs to IMP Organization. Thus, all the contestants will compete in a very competitive level, where not only the talent that became the focus of assessment, but also aspects of Sport, Communications, Modeling, and intellectual. That is, the level of Mister Teen Indonesia is actually more complicated than expected International teen competitions .

Mister Teen Indonesia first edition was held in 2015, on 6 to 10 May 2015 in East Java. There were 15 contestants selected to represent number of provinces. However, for reasons of illness and collided with the contract schedule, two contestants were finally resigned so that there were 13 contestants who competed for the title of Mister Teen Indonesia 2015.

Mister Teen Indonesia first edition was held in Taman Chandra Wilwatikta. The stage was very wide so that all the contestants freely to show off their regional costumes. The contest was attended by supporters from all over Indonesia, Mister Indonesia 2015, Mister Universal Ambassador Indonesia 2015, Miss Teen Indonesia 2015, sponsors, media partners, to local officials. Moto Nithikorn, Mister Teen International 2014 from Thailand who planned to attend had to be cancelled because there was filming project in the country.

Came out as champions in the first edition was Dolly Parlin, representative of North Sumatra. He was directly crowned by the founder of IMP Organization.

== Ownership ==
The Mister Teen Indonesia is produced and owned by Indonesia Male Pageants Organization (IMP Organization).

== Competition formats ==
There are 6 official competitions in this pageant : SPORT COMPETITION, SPEECH COMPETITION, TEEN TOP MODEL, TALENT, MULTIMEDIA, INTERVIEW and PSYCHOLOGY TEST. The number of highest points from these competitions will be semifinalist during final night. On final night, Semifinalist will compete in modeling and stage interview.

== Contestants Selection ==
Local organizations that wish to select the Mister Teen Indonesia contestant for their provinces must submit bids to the IMP Organization for that right. Occasionally, the traditional license holder for a particular provinces may lose its bid, as has happened in Sumatera Utara, Kalimantan Barat and Jawa Tengah.

Usually a province's contestant selection involves pageants in major cities, with the winners competing in a provincial pageant, but this does not always occur. This happens due to circumstances beyond the control of the regional director (i.e., political unrest). Such “online auditions” are generally discouraged by the IMP Organization, which prefers regional pageants that preserve an aura of respectability and competition.

In its inaugural edition, the regional competitions with the highest participation were Riau, West Sumatra, Jambi, and East Java. The organization has sought to expand the pageant's reach, though several eastern Indonesian provinces face participation challenges due to resource commitments and travel costs.

== Main Pageant ==
The main Mister Teen Indonesia Pageant is held for one week. The pageant period is not too long due to the commandment from the National Government which remain the contestants are in educational phases. According to the organizers, the Mister Teen Indonesia contest is more than a male pageant: Teen Boy to become Mister Teen Indonesia must be intelligent, well-mannered, and cultured. Often a candidate has lost because he did not have a good answer during the question responses rounds; although this section of competition has held less importance during recent pageants than it did in the twentieth century.

The winner is assigned a one-year contract with the IMP Organization, going to many provinces to spread messages about the public awareness of AIDS, ASEAN Community, and provisional charity. The winner also has right to represent Indonesia in International Teen Pageant. Aside from the main winner and his runners-up, special awards are also given to the winners of the best National Costume, Mister Teen Photogenic, and Mister Teen Congeniality. The Mister Teen Congeniality award is chosen by the delegates themselves.

== Recent titleholders ==
Year	Provinces	Mister Teen Indonesia	Delegated To	Result	Reign Period as MTI
2016	Banten	William Gunawan	Mister Teen International 2016	WINNER	TBA
2016	Jawa Timur	Muhammad Rizqinov	Mister Teen International 2017	TBA	TBA
2015	Jambi	Tandi Islami	Not Competing in Intl Pageant	-	2 Months
2015	North Sumatera	Dolly Parlin	Mister Teen International 2015	WINNER	2 Months

== League of Tables ==
=== By number of wins ===
Country/Territory	Titles	Winning Years
North Sumatera	1	2015
Jambi	1	2015 (successor)
Banten	1	2016
Jawa Timur	1	2016 (successor)

=== By Province tally ===
The following is similar to an Olympic medal table, that includes every provinces that has placed in the Mister Teen Indonesia pageant, based on results from the first edition in 2015.

Rank	Provinces	Mister Teen Indonesia	1st Runner-up	2nd Runner-up	3rd Runner-up	4th Runner-up	Semifinalist	Total
1	North Sumatera	1	0	0	0	0	0	1
2	Jambi	1 (Successor)	0	0	0	0	0	1
3	Riau	0	1	0	0	0	0	1
4	North Sulawesi	0	0	0	1	0	0	1
5	East Java	0	0	0	0	1	0	1
6	West Borneo	0	0	0	0	0	1	1
7	West Java	0	0	0	0	0	1	1
